The 1965 FIVB Men's World Cup was held from 13 to 19 September in Poland. Eleven nations were involved in the first edition of the competition also known as the "Tournament of the Continents" - ten countries were from Europe, the dominant continent in volleyball at the time. The only team to travel from overseas were Japan.

Results

First round

Pool A
Location: Warszawa

|}

|}

Reference:

Pool B
Location: Szczecin

|}

|}

Pool C
Location: Mielec

|}

|}

Final round
The results and the points of the matches between the same teams that were already played during the first round are taken into account for the final round.

7th–11th places
Location: Kielce

|}

|}

Final places
Location: Łódź

|}

|}

Final standing

References

FIVB Volleyball Men's World Cup
Men's World Cup
Volleyball
1965 in Polish sport